Diplomatic relations exist between Azerbaijan and Mexico. Both nations are members of the United Nations.

History

In May 1978, Mexican President, José López Portillo, visited the city of Baku while on a visit to the USSR. In April 1982, future President Heydar Aliyev paid a visit to Mexico as head of a Soviet Delegation and met with President José López Portillo. At the time, Aliyev was only a candidate of the Soviet Politburo. In December 1991, Mexico recognized the independence of Azerbaijan after the Dissolution of the Soviet Union. On 14 January 1992, both nations established diplomatic relations. At first, diplomatic relations between both nations were carried out from their respective embassies; the Azeri embassy in Washington, D.C., United States and from the Mexican embassy in Ankara, Turkey. In 2007, Azerbaijan opened an embassy in Mexico City and Mexico followed suit by opening an embassy in Baku in 2014. In 2011.

To commemorate the 200th anniversary of Mexican independence, Mexico allowed certain foreign countries to remodel parks and squares with monuments of their countries. The government of Azerbaijan chose to place a monument of former President Heydar Aliyev on the main Paseo de la Reforma in Chapultepec Park and another monument in remembrance to the Khojaly Massacre in Plaza Tlaxcoaque. 

In November 2012, relations between both nations came to an all-time low when soon after the unveiling of the statue of former Azeri President Heydar Aliyev; several residents of Mexico City accused the local city government of allowing the Azeri government of placing a statue of a "dictator" in the city. It was proposed that the local government should remove the statue and place it elsewhere, however, the Azeri embassy in Mexico City protested that if the statue were to be moved, "Azerbaijan may break diplomatic relations with Mexico." In the end, the statue of President Heydar Aliyev was moved to a private home in the city and in retaliation, the Azeri government withheld US$3.8 billion in investments. In the same month, a Mexican advisory commission said authorities had erred by accepting money to allow a foreign government to "essentially decide which political figures or historic events should be commemorated in Mexico City's public spaces." Adding that "a plaque on the monument [dedicated to massacre] calling the Azerbaijani deaths "genocide" was misleading." Recommending that authorities take action, it was decided that the word "genocide" was to be removed and replaced with "massacre".

In 2014, a delegation of Mexican Senators paid an official four-day visit to Azerbaijan, led by Senator Gabriela Cuevas Barrón. In November 2017, two Mexican Congressional Deputies, while on an official visit to Armenia as part of the Mexico-Armenia Friendship Group on the invitation of the Armenian government; visited the disputed territory of the Republic of Artsakh. Their visit created a diplomatic flare-up between Azerbaijan and Mexico.

In December 2018, Azeri Foreign Minister Elmar Mammadyarov attended the inauguration of Mexican President Andrés Manuel López Obrador.

High-level visits
High-level visits from Azerbaijan to Mexico

 Foreign Minister Elmar Mammadyarov (2011, 2012, 2018)
 Deputy Prime Minister Ali S. Hasanov (2012)

High-level visits from Mexico to Azerbaijan
 Foreign Undersecretary Lourdes Aranda Bezaury (2008)
 Senator Gabriela Cuevas Barrón (2014)

Bilateral agreements
Both nations have signed several bilateral agreements such as an Agreement on Academic Diplomatic Cooperation between the Azeri Ministry of Foreign Affairs and the Mexican Secretariat of Foreign Affairs (2008); Memorandum of Understanding for the Establishment of a Mechanism of Consultation in Matters of Mutual Interest (2008); Agreement on Visa Exemption for Diplomatic Passport holders (2008); Agreement on the issue of joint brands between both nations Postal Services (2010) and an Agreement of Cooperation in Telecommunications, Information and Communication Technologies (2010).

Trade relation
In 2018, two-way trade between both nations amounted to US$10 million. Azerbaijan's main exports to Mexico include: computer equipment, assembly goods, modular circuits, dissected zoological specimens or their assembled piezoelectric parts and crystals. Mexico's main exports to Azerbaijan include: casing tubes, malt beer, household goods, motor boats and three-wheeled motorcycles.

Resident diplomatic missions
 Azerbaijan has an embassy in Mexico City.
 Mexico has an embassy in Baku.

See also
 Foreign relations of Azerbaijan
 Foreign relations of Mexico

References

 
Mexico
Bilateral relations of Mexico